Higham Ferrers is a former railway station on the Higham Ferrers branch line from Wellingborough.  It served the market town of Higham Ferrers, Northamptonshire, England.

The station was opened by the Midland Railway on 1 May 1894, and was named Higham Ferrers. It was renamed Higham Ferrers and Irthlingborough on 1 July 1902, but reverted to its original name on 1 October 1910. It was closed by British Railways on 15 June 1959.

The line was closed in 1969, and the station has since been demolished and the track lifted. It is the eventual aim of the Heritage Rushden, Higham & Wellingborough Railway to reopen the line to Higham Ferrers from its base at Rushden station.

See also 
 List of closed railway stations in Britain

References

External links
 Disused stations

Disused railway stations in Northamptonshire
Rushden
Railway stations in Great Britain closed in 1959
Former Midland Railway stations
Railway stations in Great Britain opened in 1894